José Matías Grez y Ubeda (1766–1840) was Chilean politician, mayor of Rancagua between 1804 and 1805. Born in Santiago to Juan Antonio Grez y Díaz-Pimienta and Manuela Josefa Ubeda y Vélez, Grez was educated at the Seminary of Santiago (Seminario de Santiago). He married Mercedes Fontecilla Valenzuela in 1800, with whom he had no children.

References

1766 births
1840 deaths
Jose Matias
Mayors of places in Chile
People from Rancagua